The Rossauer Barracks (in German, Rossauer Kaserne) is a barracks in the 9th district of Vienna, in the Rossau quarter of the city. It serves as the headquarters of the Defense Ministry.

In January 2020 the Rossauer Barracks has been renamed to Bernardis-Schmid-Kaserne.

History
It was built as the Crown Prince Rudolf Barracks (Kronprinz-Rudolf-Kaserne, named after Rudolf, Crown Prince of Austria), at the same time as the Franz-Joseph-Kaserne and Arsenal, as part of an overall approach to protect the city in the aftermath of the 1848 Revolution.

References

Buildings and structures in Alsergrund
Barracks in Austria
Rudolf, Crown Prince of Austria